Chondrostoma meandrense, sometimes called the Menderes nase or Işıklı nase, is a species of ray-finned fish in the family Cyprinidae.
It is found only in Turkey.
Its natural habitat is rivers.
It is threatened by habitat loss.

References

 

Chondrostoma
Endemic fauna of Turkey
Fish of Turkey
Fish described in 1987
Taxonomy articles created by Polbot